Whitehall or White Hall is a house in Clarksville, Tennessee, that was built circa 1839. It housed a girls' school in the late 1840s. White Hall School was established in 1845 by Lucy Williams, widow of Fielding Williams, a tobacconist and owner of Ringgold Mill. He built the home White Hall in 1839. White Hall School operated through the Civil War under the guidance of Lucy Williams and her sister Mollie Ward. Now a private residence, it was listed on the National Register of Historic Places on January 31, 1978.

The listing was for architecture, which includes Greek Revival and Georgian architectural elements.  The listing covered a  property that included three contributing buildings and one other contributing structure.

References

Houses on the National Register of Historic Places in Tennessee
Georgian architecture in Tennessee
Greek Revival houses in Tennessee
Houses completed in 1839
Buildings and structures in Clarksville, Tennessee
Houses in Montgomery County, Tennessee
National Register of Historic Places in Montgomery County, Tennessee